Zheng Weiping (born July 1955) is a general (shangjiang) of the People's Liberation Army (PLA) of China. He was Political Commissar of the Strategic Support Force between 2017 and 2020. He previously served as Political Commissar of the Nanjing Military Region (2012–2016) and Political Commissar of the Eastern Theater Command (2016–2017).

Biography
Zheng was born in Wanrong County, Shanxi province. He served at one point as secretary to General Li Jinai. In 2003 he began a stint overseeing political education at the National Defence University.  In 2005 he became political commissar of the 41st Group Army. In 2007, he became the head of the political department of the Guangzhou Military Region. In October 2012 he was appointed political commissar of the Nanjing Military Region. On 31 July 2015, Zheng was promoted to general (shang jiang), the highest rank for Chinese military officers in active service.

In 2016 Zheng became the inaugural political commissar of the newly established Eastern Theater Command. In September 2017 he was appointed political commissar of the Strategic Support Force, replacing Genenral Liu Fulian. He Ping succeeded Zheng as the Eastern TC commissar.

On February 28, 2021, he was appointed vice-chairperson of the National People's Congress Education, Science, Culture and Public Health Committee.

Zheng has been a member of the 18th and 19th Central Committees of the Communist Party of China.

References 

1955 births
Living people
People's Liberation Army generals from Shanxi
People from Yuncheng
Political commissars of the People's Liberation Army
Political commissars of the Nanjing Military Region
Members of the 19th Central Committee of the Chinese Communist Party
Members of the 18th Central Committee of the Chinese Communist Party